Shad Azimabadi (8 Jan 1846–7 Jan 1927) was an Indian poet and writer from Azimabad, Patna, Bihar.

Personal life 
Bismil Azimabadi was disciple of Shad Azimabadi.

Azimabadi's granddaughter Shahnaz Fatmi is also a writer.

References 

1846 births
1927 deaths
Urdu-language poets from India
Poets from Bihar
Writers from Patna
19th-century Indian poets